Bethlehem House, also known as the Rensselaer Nicoll House, is a historic home located on Dinmore Road in Bethlehem, Albany County, New York.  It was originally built about 1735 and expanded in 1796, 1810 (kitchen wing), and 1830 (tea room and office).  It is two and one half stories high with two and one story additions in the rear.  It is constructed of brick with a gambrel roof and three chimneys.  It features a one-story Victorian-era entrance porch.

It was listed on the National Register of Historic Places in 1973.

References

External links
I SPY MY HOMETOWN website

Houses on the National Register of Historic Places in New York (state)
Houses completed in 1735
Houses in Albany County, New York
Historic American Buildings Survey in New York (state)
National Register of Historic Places in Albany County, New York